Federico Vilar Baudena (born 30 May 1977) is an Argentine football manager and former player who played as a goalkeeper.

Vilar played the majority of his career in Mexico where played for five different clubs. He also won four different titles and scored four goals all by free kicks. Vilar was known for his great reflexes and established himself as one of Mexico's best goalkeepers, his charisma and leadership ability has also earned him the title of team captain throughout his career.

Career
Vilar began his career playing for Boca Juniors in Argentina from 1993 to 2000 and Almirante Brown from 2000 to 2001. He then migrated to Mexico and played for second division team Acapulco until making his debut in Mexico's First Division on 1 December 2003, against Monterrey.

Vilar played for Atlante for seven years where he won the Apertura 2007 league title, the 2008–09 CONCACAF Champions League, and played in the 2009 FIFA Club World Cup.

Vilar moved to Morelia in 2010 where he won the 2010 North American SuperLiga, reached the Clausura 2011 league final, and won the Apertura 2013 Copa MX. He later played for Atlas and Club Tijuana. Vilar announced his retirement in a press conference in Tijuana on 29 November 2016.

Throughout his career, Vilar wore the number 3 jersey as a tribute to his father.

Free Kicks 
Vilar scored four goals in his five-year career at Atlante. The first one, against Necaxa, was scored on 1 February 2004. The second was scored on 12 August 2006, against Cruz Azul. He also scored a goal by free kick against the Chilean champion Colo-Colo during an exhibition match. Also, on 8 October 2008, he scored another goal from a free kick against CD Olimpia of Honduras in the CONCACAF Champions League.

Honours

Player 
 Atlante
 Primera División de México (1): Apertura 2007'''
 CONCACAF Champions League (1): 2008–09

 Morelia
Copa MX (1): Apertura 2013
 North American SuperLiga (1): 2010

References

External links 
 
 Game Statistics
 Guardian statistics
 

1977 births
Living people
People from Junín, Buenos Aires
Sportspeople from Buenos Aires Province
Argentine footballers
Argentine expatriate footballers
Argentine emigrants to Mexico
Naturalized citizens of Mexico
Primera B Metropolitana players
Liga MX players
Club Almirante Brown footballers
Atlante F.C. footballers
Atlético Morelia players
Atlas F.C. footballers
Club Tijuana footballers
Expatriate footballers in Mexico
Association football goalkeepers
Argentine football managers
Argentine expatriate football managers
Chilean Primera División managers
Unión La Calera managers
Expatriate football managers in Mexico
Expatriate football managers in Chile
Argentine expatriate sportspeople in Mexico
Argentine expatriate sportspeople in Chile